A Wolf–Rayet nebula is a nebula which surrounds a Wolf–Rayet star.

WR nebulae have been classified in various ways. One of the earliest was by the nature and origin of the nebula:
 HII regions
 ejecta-type nebulae
 wind-blown bubbles

This classification requires detailed study of each nebula and more recent attempts have been made to allow quick classification of nebulae based purely on their appearance.  WR nebulae frequently are ring-shaped in appearance, possibly spherical.  Others are irregular, either disrupted shells or formed from clumpy ejection.

Examples of this type of nebula include NGC 6888, NGC 2359, and NGC 3199. Some WR nebulae have a prominent spiral structure, for example the WR 104, formerly securing them with the categorization of pinwheel nebulae.

References

 
Nebulae